Computer Sciences Raytheon (CSR) joint venture partnership of Computer Sciences Corporation and Raytheon Technical Services Company. CSR is the contractor that has managed the Eastern Test Range since 1988. CSR is headquartered at Patrick Space Force Base, Florida.

History

In October 1988, CSR took over management of the Eastern Range through the Range Technical Services contract, replacing Pan American World Service and subcontractor General Electric (formerly RCA Service Company). On August 23, 2007, it was announced that CSR had been awarded then current Eastern Range Technical Services contract to continue managing the Eastern Range for the foreseeable future.

Locations

Besides Patrick Space Force Base, CSR operations include the following locations:

 Cape Canaveral Space Force Station
 Jonathon Dickinson Missile Tracking Annex
Antigua Air Station
Ascension Auxiliary Air Field

See also 
 Pan American Airways Guided Missile Range Division

References 

Companies based in Brevard County, Florida